Matt Prime is a multi-award winning, multi-platinum selling English songwriter and record producer based in the UK.

Biography 
Prime grew up in Somerset and studied music at university in London.  After graduating he secured a publishing deal with Sony/ATV and has since written over fifteen Top 10 hit singles, five Top 5 UK singles and a US Billboard Chart #1 single. His writing and production credits include: Sam Smith, Charlie Puth, Aloe Blacc, Trey Songz, Jason Derulo, CeeLo Green, Jake Bugg, Kylie Minogue, Maverick Sabre, JP Cooper, James Blunt, The Vamps, Olly Murs, Eliza Doolittle and more.

Selected songwriting/production credits

References

External links 
 https://www.imdb.com/name/nm9399394/

English songwriters
English record producers
Musicians from Somerset
Living people
Year of birth missing (living people)